Star Mega Mall is a shopping mall located in Sibu, Sarawak, Malaysia. The mall houses the first hypermarket in Sibu, Daesco Hypermarket and Departmental Store as well as the largest all-in-one shopping mall in Sarawak's Central Region.

Overview
The plan to develop Star Mega Mall started in 1998. The mall was constructed at a total cost of over RM40 million.

The mall was officially declared open by then Second Finance Minister Dato Sri Wong Soon Koh in late September 2011.

Tenants
Anchor tenants
Daesco Hypermarket and Departmental Store

Other tenants
Bata
GNC Livewell
Guardian
Hong Kong Sheng Kee Dessert
Kioda
Marrybrown
Maxis Store
MR.D.I.Y.
Nene Chicken
Oppo Experience Store
Pezzo
Sushi King
TRIO by Jerasia
Watsons

Future expansion plan
In December 2021, Daesim Group of Companies chairman, Dato Lau Ngie Hua told journalists of early plan to build phase 2 of the mall which would accommodate more facilities such has a bigger food court, a cinema with seven halls and also more than 400 stalls.

Notelist

References

Shopping malls in Sarawak
Shopping malls established in 2011